Sonoran(s) may refer to:
 Something derived from or related to the State of Sonora in the country of Mexico, in North America
 Sonoran people from the Mexican State of Sonora and their descendants
 Places or things in the Mexican State of Sonora like the Sonoran Desert or Sonoran cuisine

 People or things from Sonora, California

See also